Traveston is a rural town and locality in the Gympie Region, Queensland, Australia. In the  the locality of Traveston had a population of 480 people.

Geography
Traveston is predominantly farm land with a small urban area to the west of the Traveston railway station  on the North Coast railway line which passes through the north-eastern part of the locality from the south-east to the north-west. The Bruce Highway passes through the south-western part of the locality travelling from the south-west to the north-west. Traveston Road connects the highway to the railway station and then follows the railway line to the south-east to neighbouring Cooran.

Green Ridge is a neighbourhood in the locality.

Dairying is the main industry.

History
The town is believed to be named after an early settler/grazier called Traves or Travers who was in the area in the 1860s.

Traveston Provisional School opened on 24 August 1891. In 1907 it was renamed Skyring's Creek Provisional School. On 1 January 1909 it became Skyring's Creek State School. In 1915 it was renamed Coles Creek State School. It closed on 27 February 1961. Its location was in neighbouring Coles Creek to the south.

Traveston Siding Provisional School opened on 4 August 1896. On 1 January 1909 it became Traveston Siding State school. In 1929 it was renamed Traveston State School. It  closed on 9 June 1967. The school was on the Traveston Road immediately south of the junction with the Tandur Traveston Road (approx ).

Green Ridge State School opened on 22 April 1912 and closed in August 1960. The school was on the south-eastern corner of the Old Bruce Highway and the Old Traveston Road (approx ).

In the 2011 census, Traveston had a population of 470 people.

In the  the locality of Traveston had a population of 480 people.

Heritage listings
Traveston has a number of heritage-listed sites, including:
 Alford Street: Traveston Railway Station
 1813 Bruce Highway: Traveston Homestead
 7 Traveston Road: Traveston Powder Magazine (incorporated in Traveston Soldiers' Memorial Hall)

Education
There are no schools in Traveston. The nearest government primay schools are Cooran State School in neighbouring Cooran to the east and Dagun State School in Dagun to the west. The nearest government secondary schools are Noosa District State High School (which has its junior campus in Pomona and its senior campus in Cooroy, both to the south-east) and Gympie State High School in Gympie to the north-west.

Attractions
Dingo Creek Winery and Vineyard is at 265 Tandur Traveston Road. There are tours and tastings available.

Events 
The Dingo Creek Jazz and Blues Festival is an annual event since 2002 at the Dingo Creek Winery. It raises money for community charities as well as for Sudden infant death syndrome.

References

External links 

Towns in Queensland
Gympie Region
Localities in Queensland